Summer Nights is the expanded reissue of What Is Love?, the fifth extended play release by South Korean girl group Twice. It was released on July 9, 2018, by JYP Entertainment.

Background and release
On June 7, 2018, JYP Entertainment (JYPE) confirmed that Twice was scheduled to make a comeback in July and that the music video for the title track was filmed in Japan. Later that month, it was officially announced that Twice would release a special album titled Summer Nights, a reissue of their fifth extended play (EP) What Is Love?. The EP includes nine songs, including the six found on the original release, and three new songs, including the single, "Dance the Night Away", "Chillax" and "Shot Thru the Heart", which was written by Twice's Japanese members Momo, Sana and Mina.

A short video preview of the three new songs was released on July 8. The album, along with the music video of "Dance the Night Away", was officially released the next day on various music portals.

Promotion
On June 19, 2018, it was confirmed that Twice would guest on Idol Room, the group's first variety show for their comeback with Summer Nights.

Track listing

Personnel
Credits adapted from album liner notes.

 J. Y. Park "The Asiansoul" – producer
 Lee Ji-young – direction and coordination (A&R)
 Jang Ha-na – music (A&R)
 Kim Yeo-joo (Jane Kim) – music (A&R)
 Kim Ji-hyeong – production (A&R)
 Cha Ji-yoon – production (A&R)
 Choi A-ra – production (A&R)
 Kim Bo-hyeon – design (A&R), album art direction and design
 Kim Tae-eun – design (A&R), album art direction and design, and web design
 Choi Jeong-eun – design (A&R) and album art direction and design
 Lee So-yeon – design (A&R), album art direction and design, and web design
 Seo Yeon-ah – design (A&R) and web design
 Choi Hye-jin – recording and mixing engineer, digital editor (on "Dance the Night Away")
 Lim Hong-jin – recording and mixing engineer
 Eom Se-hee – recording and mixing engineer
 No Min-ji – recording engineer
 Tony Maserati – mixing engineer
 James Krausse – mixing engineer
 Lee Tae-seop – mixing engineer
 Ko Hyeon-jeong – mixing engineer
 Master Key – mixing engineer
 Kwon Nam-woo – mastering engineer
 Naive Production – video director
 Kim Young-jo – video executive producer
 Yoo Seung-woo – video executive producer
 Kwak Gi-gon at TEO Agency – photographer
 Jung Nan-young at Lulu – hair director
 Son Eun-hee at Lulu – hair director
 Choi Ji-young at Lulu – hair director
 Jo Sang-ki at Lulu – makeup director
 Zia at Lulu – makeup director
 Jeon Dal-lae at Lulu – makeup director
 Won Jung-yo at Bit&Boot – makeup director
 Choi Su-ji at Bit&Boot – makeup director
 Oh Yu-ra – style director
 Shin Hyun-kuk – management and marketing director
 Kang Da-sol – choreographer
 Kim Sun-mi – choreographer
 Nana choreographer crew – choreographer
 Today Art – printing
 Moonshine – all instruments (on "Dance the Night Away")
 Wheesung (Realslow) – vocal director (on "Dance the Night Away")
 Kwon Seo-young – background vocals (on "Dance the Night Away")
 Jung Eun-kyung – digital editor (on "Dance the Night Away")
 Lee Woo-min "collapsedone" – all instruments, computer programming, guitar, and synths (on "Chillax" and "What Is Love?"), piano (on "What Is Love?")
 Friday of Galactika – vocal director (on "Chillax"), vocal producer and background vocals (on "What Is Love?" and "Stuck"), recording engineer (on "Stuck")
 E.Na – background vocals (on "Chillax", "What Is Love?" and "Stuck")
 David Anthony Eames – all instruments and computer programming (on "Shot Thru the Heart")
 Kevin Oppa – vocal director (on "Shot Thru the Heart")
 Park Sung-mi – background vocals (on "Shot Thru the Heart")
 Park Soo-min – background vocals (on "What Is Love?", "Sweet Talker" and "Ho!")
 Erik Lidbom – all instruments, computer programming, and digital editor (on "Sweet Talker")
 Armadillo – vocal director (on "Sweet Talker")
 Jiyoung Shin NYC – additional editor (on "Sweet Talker", "Ho!", and "Dejavu")
 The Elev3n – all instruments, computer programming, and digital editor (on "Ho!")
 Kim Seung-soo – vocal director (on "Ho!")
 Mental Audio (Eirik Johansen and Jan Hallvard Larsen) – all instruments and computer programming (on "Dejavu")
 Hayley Aitken – background vocals (on "Dejavu")
 Anne Judith Wik – background vocals (on "Dejavu")
 Jowul – vocal director (on "Dejavu")
 Lee Ju-hyeong – recording engineer, and vocal director, keyboard, Pro Tools operator, and digital editor (on "Say Yes")
 Jeon Jae-hee – background vocals (on "Say Yes")
 Jeok Jae – guitar (on "Say Yes")
 Kim Byeong-seok – bass (on "Say Yes")
 Frants – all instruments, computer programming, synth, bass, and drum (on "Stuck")
 Shane – guitar (on "Stuck")

Locations
Recording
JYPE Studios, Seoul, South Korea

Mixing
Mirrorball Studios, North Hollywood, California
JYPE Studios, Seoul, South Korea
Koko Sound, Seoul, South Korea
821 Sound, Seoul, South Korea

Mastering
821 Sound Mastering, Seoul, South Korea

Charts

Weekly charts

Year-end charts

Certifications

Accolades

Release history

References

2018 EPs
Twice (group) EPs
JYP Entertainment EPs
Korean-language EPs
Reissue albums
IRiver EPs